Intihuatana  antarctica is a species of South American spider in the dwarf sheet spider family, Hahniidae. It is the only species in the monotypic genus Intihuatana. It was first described by Pekka T. Lehtinen in 1967, and has only been found in Argentina.

References

Hahniidae
Spiders described in 1902
Spiders of Argentina
Taxa named by Pekka T. Lehtinen